Colias grumi is a butterfly in the family Pieridae. It is found in north-western China (described from Nanshan).

Subspecies

All described subspecies may be only ecological variations, and therefore junior synonyms. The taxa C. g. burchana and C. g. evanescens are only provisionally accepted as subspecies
C. g. grumi
C. g. aljinshana Huang & Murayama, 1992 Xinjiang.
C. g. dvoraki Kocman, 1994

Description
It is similar to Colias cocandica  but is lighter in colour, the hindwing beneath being blue-grey, not greenish.

Taxonomy
Accepted as a species by Josef Grieshuber & Gerardo Lamas

References

External links
Euroleps includes image

grumi
Butterflies described in 1897
Butterflies of Asia